Al-Mukharram al-Tahtani is a village in central Syria, administratively part of the Homs Governorate, located northeast of Homs. Nearby localities include Ayn al-Niser to the west, Umm al-Amad to the southwest, al-Mukharram to the southeast and Danibah and Khunayfis to the north. According to the Syria Central Bureau of Statistics (CBS), al-Mukharram al-Tahtani had a population of 3,035 in the 2004 census.

References

Populated places in al-Mukharram District